White boiled shrimp  is a variety of night dish in Cantonese cuisine.  The dish is made with shrimp in boiling hot water, and served with the shells.  The shrimp is then eaten with soy sauce.  When finished, people wash their hands in a bowl of warm tea and lemon.

References

Cantonese cuisine
Hong Kong cuisine
Shrimp dishes